Sam Grimley (born 3 January 1991) is a former Australian rules football player who played for the Hawthorn Football Club and Essendon Football Club in the Australian Football League.

After Hawthorn won the 2008 premiership, the Hawthorn recruitment officer concentrated on the younger players in the 2009 AFL draft.  Grimley was a third-round selection (Hawthorn), No. 39 overall.

The lightly built former junior basketballer came to Hawthorn as a long-term project. After three years of development, the club started seeing good results. Grimley spent much time close to goal in 2012, hoping to set himself up as a forward/ruck option. He played six games in Box Hill's senior team early in the year but suffered a hand injury. Grimley started 2013 showing strong performances for Box Hill and the selectors were watching. Grimley was named as an emergency for the Hawks on a number of occasions in 2013. An ankle injury to David Hale helped open up an opportunity for Grimley to debut against  in Round 9 of the 2013 AFL season. His debut started well by taking an early mark and kicking a goal with his first kick in the AFL. He finished with fourteen possessions and 11 hit-outs before being subbed off at three quarter time.

Grimley did not play a senior game in 2014, and spent the whole season playing with Hawthorn's , Box Hill. He tied with Port Melbourne's Daniel Connors as the leading goalkicker in the 2014 VFL home-and-away season, kicking 38 goals for the year. Hawthorn delisted Grimley from its senior list at the end at the end of 2014, but resigned him in the rookie draft. In 2015 he again spent the whole season playing for Box Hill, and with 42 goals was again joint-winner of the Frosty Miller Medal.

He was delisted at the conclusion of the 2015 season.

He is the son of Brett Grimley and the grandson of Ken Grimley, who were both accomplished footballers in the Queensland Australian Football League.

Statistics

|- style=background:#EAEAEA
| 2010 ||  || 35
| 0 || — || — || — || — || — || — || — || — || — || — || — || — || — || — || — || — || 0
|- 
| 2011 ||  || 35
| 0 || — || — || — || — || — || — || — || — || — || — || — || — || — || — || — || — || 0
|- style=background:#EAEAEA
| 2012 ||  || 35
| 0 || — || — || — || — || — || — || — || — || — || — || — || — || — || — || — || — || 0
|-
| 2013 ||  || 35
| 3 || 3 || 2 || 21 || 18 || 39 || 16 || 2 || 24 || 1.0 || 0.7 || 7.0 || 6.0 || 13.0 || 5.3 || 0.7 || 8.0 || 0
|- style=background:#EAEAEA
| 2014 ||  || 35
| 0 || — || — || — || — || — || — || — || — || — || — || — || — || — || — || — || — || 0
|-
| 2015 ||  || 35
| 0 || — || — || — || — || — || — || — || — || — || — || — || — || — || — || — || — || 0
|- style=background:#EAEAEA
| 2016 ||  || 54
| 4 || 5 || 1 || 19 || 8 || 27 || 10 || 5 || 8 || 1.3 || 0.3 || 4.8 || 2.0 || 6.8 || 2.5 || 1.3 || 2.0 || 0
|- class="sortbottom"
! colspan=3| Career
! 7 !! 8 !! 3 !! 40 !! 26 !! 66 !! 26 !! 7 !! 32 !! 1.1 !! 0.4 !! 5.7 !! 3.7 !! 9.4 !! 3.7 !! 1.0 !! 4.6 !! 0
|}

Honours and achievements
Team
 Minor premiership: 2013
 VFL premiership player: 2013
 Minor premiership: 2015

Individual
 2× Jim 'Frosty' Miller Medal: 2014, 2015
 3×  leading goalkicker: 2013, 2014, 2015

Cited references

External links
 

1991 births
Australian rules footballers from Victoria (Australia)
Box Hill Football Club players
Essendon Football Club players
Hawthorn Football Club players
Living people
Northern Knights players